Lauro César Mouro Chaman (born 25 June 1987 in Araraquara) is a Brazilian para cyclist, who currently rides for Memorial–Santos–Fupes.

Career
In the 2016 Summer Paralympics, Chaman won the bronze medal in the C5 time trial, and finished second to Daniel Abraham Gebru in the C4–5 road race.

In 2017, Chaman joined UCI Professional Continental team .

The following season, he won the Brazilian National Time Trial Championships.

Major results
2018
 1st  Time trial, National Road Championships
2019
 5th Time trial, National Road Championships
2021
 1st  Time trial, National Road Championships
2022
 National Road Championships
1st  Time trial
4th Road race
 4th Time trial, Pan American Road Championships

References

External links

1987 births
Living people
Brazilian male cyclists
Brazilian road racing cyclists
Brazilian track cyclists
Paralympic cyclists of Brazil
Cyclists at the 2016 Summer Paralympics
Medalists at the 2016 Summer Paralympics
Paralympic bronze medalists for Brazil
Medalists at the 2015 Parapan American Games
Cyclists at the 2020 Summer Paralympics
20th-century Brazilian people
21st-century Brazilian people